Princess Salimah Aga Khan (née Sarah Frances Croker Poole; born 28 January 1940), also known as Begum Salimah Aga Khan, is a former fashion model and an ex-wife of the 49th Ismaili Shia Imam, the IV Aga Khan Prince Karim Aga Khan.

Early life
Princess Salimah was born at New Delhi, British India, as Sarah Frances Croker Poole. She is the daughter of Lieutenant-Colonel Arthur Edward Croker Poole and his wife, Jean Margaret Watson. She was one of the last generation of debutantes to be presented to the Queen, in 1958.

She married, firstly, Lord James Charles Crichton-Stuart, son of John Crichton-Stuart, 5th Marquess of Bute and Lady Eileen Beatrice Forbes, on 25 June 1959. She and Lord James Charles Crichton-Stuart were divorced in 1968.

She married, secondly, Prince Karim Aga Khan IV, son of Prince Aly Khan and Hon. Princess Taj-ud-dawlah Aga Khan, in 1969.
During her marriage to the Aga Khan, her official name was Her Highness The Begum Aga Khan, although she remained informally known as Sally. Following their divorce in 1995, she kept the title of "Princess" (but losing the style "Highness").

In November 1995, "Jewels from the Personal Collection of Princess Salimah Aga Khan" realised $27,682,601 at Christie's, Geneva.

Charitable career
She is now a child-welfare activist and a prominent supporter of the charity SOS Children's Villages, becoming its first International Ambassador.  As part of her welfare activity she has also aided Afghan refugees.

She has also been active in the Aga Khan Development Network.

Personal life
She has three children with the Aga Khan: Princess Zahra Aga Khan (born 18 September 1970), Prince Rahim Aga Khan (born 12 October 1971) and Prince Hussain Aga Khan (born 10 April 1974).

Salimah Aga Khan has lived in Geneva, Switzerland, since 1969.

References

1940 births
Living people
British debutantes
Noorani family
Jewellery collectors
British expatriates in Switzerland